The Princeton Tigers men's squash team is the intercollegiate men's squash team for Princeton University located in Princeton, New Jersey. The team competes in the Ivy League within the College Squash Association. The university created a squash team in 1930. The current head coach is Sean Wilkinson.

History 
John Conroy, who coached for three decades (1940-69), won 180 matches and the program's first Ivy League title in 1957, and he is also an inductee in the College Squash Hall of Fame.

Both a College Hall of Fame and US Squash Hall of Fame inductee, Bob Callahan, who retired following the 2013 Ivy League championship season, won the most matches (316) and Ivy League titles (11) in program history.

Princeton's most historic victory came in 2012 national team championship final over Trinity, in which the Tigers ended a sensational 13-year winning streak for Trinity. Princeton was down 4–2 in the match and rallied to win 5–4.

 2012 National Champion

Year-by-year results

Men's Squash 
Updated February 2023.

Players

Current roster 
Updated February 2023.

|}

Notable former players 
Notable alumni include:
 Yasser El Halaby '06, Former world no. 40, 54–6 career record, 4x 1st-team All-American and 4x 1st-team All-Ivy, 4x individual national champion, widely considered to be the best ever collegiate squash player 
 Todd Harrity '13, Current world no. 37, 59–10 career record, 4 PSA titles, 4x 1st-team All-American and 4x 1st-team All-Ivy, 2011 individual national champion, Skillman Award Winner 
 Youssef Ibrahim '22, Current world no. 17, 43–12 career record, 6 PSA titles, 3x 1st-team All-American and 3x 1st-team All-Ivy, 2022 individual national runner up

See also
 List of college squash schools

References

External links 
 

 
College men's squash teams in the United States
Sports clubs established in 1930